George William Arthur Wright (1893–1949) was an English bowls player who competed in the 1930 British Empire Games and 1938 British Empire Games.

Bowls career
At the 1930 British Empire Games he won the gold medal in the pairs event with Tommy Hills. The pair repeated the success four years later at the 1934 British Empire Games.

He was the 1928 singles National Champion.

Personal life
He was a cinema proprietor at the Variety Theatre, in Eastleigh, by trade and married Jessie Mary Parker, they lived in Upper Bassett, Southampton.

References

English male bowls players
Bowls players at the 1930 British Empire Games
Bowls players at the 1934 British Empire Games
Commonwealth Games gold medallists for England
Commonwealth Games medallists in lawn bowls
1893 births
1949 deaths
Medallists at the 1930 British Empire Games
Medallists at the 1934 British Empire Games